Çobanlı can refer to:

 Çobanlı, Ardahan
 Çobanlı, İliç